Amdursky is a Jewish surname. Notable persons with that name include:

Assaf Amdursky (born 1971), Israeli singer, songwriter and music producer
, Israeli singer from the Israeli duo Dudaim
Michal Amdursky (born 1975), Israeli dancer and singer

See also

Jewish surnames